Lord Richard in the Pantry  is a 1930 British comedy film directed by Walter Forde and starring Richard Cooper, Dorothy Seacombe and Marjorie Hume.

No print of the film is known to exist, and it is included on the British Film Institute's "75 Most Wanted" list of missing British feature films.

Plot summary
The story is taken from the homonymous book written by Maurice Nicoll under the pen-name "Martin Swayne".
Lord Richard falls on hard times, and has to take a job as a butler. Meanwhile, his employer falls in love with him.

Cast
 Richard Cooper as Lord Richard Sandridge
 Dorothy Seacombe as Sylvia Garland
 Marjorie Hume as Lady Violet Elliott
 Leo Sheffield as Carter
 Frederick Volpe as Sir Charles Bundleman
 Barbara Gott as Cook
 Alexander Field as Sam
 Viola Lyel as Evelyn Lovejoy
 Gladys Hamer as Gladys

See also
List of lost films

References
>

External links
 BFI 75 Most Wanted entry, with extensive notes

1930 films
1930 comedy films
British comedy films
Films directed by Walter Forde
Lost British films
British black-and-white films
1930 lost films
Lost comedy films
1930s English-language films
1930s British films